Trail of the Horse Thieves is a 1929 American silent Western film directed by Robert De Lacey and written by Frank Howard Clark and Helen Gregg. The film stars Tom Tyler, Betty Amann, Harry O'Connor, Frankie Darro, Barney Furey and Bill Nestell. The film was released on January 13, 1929, by Film Booking Offices of America.

Cast        
 Tom Tyler as Vic Stanley
 Betty Amann as Amy Taggart 
 Harry O'Connor as Clint Taggart
 Frankie Darro as Buddy
 Barney Furey as The Eagle
 Bill Nestell as Babcock 
 Victor Allen as Sheriff 
 Ray Childs as Rustler
 Leo Willett as Curtis

References

External links
 

1929 films
1929 Western (genre) films
Film Booking Offices of America films
Films directed by Robert De Lacey
American black-and-white films
Silent American Western (genre) films
1920s English-language films
1920s American films